A.V.Anoop is an Indian entrepreneur, social worker and film producer.  He is the managing director of AVA Group of companies, a consortium of ayurvedic, herbal and food products and has also produced Paleri Manikyam: Oru Pathirakolapathakathinte Katha (film), that won the 2009 Kerala State Film Award for Best Film and Vishwaguru, a film that was made and released in 51 hours and 2 minutes following a "script to screen" rule, creating a new Guinness World Records.

Filmography

Personal life
A.V.Anoop is the son of (Late) Shri.A.G.Vasavan and Smt.Lilly Bai. He had his schooling with St. Joseph's Higher Secondary School, Thiruvananthapuram and graduated in Commerce from Mahatma Gandhi College, Thiruvananthapuram. He stays at Chennai with his family.

References

External links

Businesspeople from Thrissur
Living people
1962 births
Tamil entrepreneurs
Tamil film producers
Malayalam film producers
Kerala State Film Award winners